Ludonarrative dissonance is the conflict between a video game's narrative told through the story and the narrative told through the gameplay. Ludonarrative, a compound of ludology and narrative, refers to the intersection in a video game of ludic elements (gameplay) and narrative elements. The term was coined by game designer Clint Hocking in 2007 in a blog post.

History
Clint Hocking, a former creative director at LucasArts (then at Ubisoft), coined the term on his blog in October 2007, in response to the game BioShock. As explained by Hocking, BioShock is themed around the principles of Objectivism and the nature of free will, taking place in a dystopia within the underwater city of Rapture. During the game, the player-character encounters Little Sisters, young girls that have been conditioned to extract a rare resource from corpses, which is used as a means to increase the player-character's abilities. The player has the option of following the Objectivist approach by killing the Little Sister and gaining a larger amount of the resource, or following a compassionate approach, freeing the girl from the conditioning and only receiving a modest amount of the resource in return; this choice upholds the nature of free will that the gameplay presents, according to Hocking. Hocking then points out that as the story progresses, the player-character is forced into accepting one specific path, to help the person behind the revolution within Rapture, and given no option to challenge that role. This seemingly strips away the notion of free will that the gameplay had offered. Hocking claimed that because of this, BioShock promotes the theme of self-interest through its gameplay while promoting the opposing theme of selflessness through its narrative, creating a violation of aesthetic distance that often pulls the player out of the game. Jonathan Blow also used BioShock as an example in his 2008 talk. Writer Tom Bissell, in his book Extra Lives: Why Video Games Matter (2010), notes the example of Call of Duty 4: Modern Warfare, where a player can all but kill their digital partner during gameplay without upsetting the built-in narrative of the game. Brett Makedonski of Destructoid used the Mass Effect series as another example, in which the player-character Commander Shepard can perform actions that are seen as ethically good (Paragon) or bad (Renegade), but throughout the game, Shepard is still regarded as a hero regardless of how much of a Renegade status they may have obtained.

Jeffrey Matulef of Eurogamer used the term when referencing the Uncharted series, saying that "Uncharted has often been mocked for being about a supposedly likable rogue who just so happens to recklessly slaughter hundreds of people". Uncharted 4: A Thief's End acknowledged the criticism with a trophy called "Ludonarrative Dissonance" that is awarded to the player for killing 1,000 enemies. The game's co-director Neil Druckmann said that in Uncharted 4 the studio was "conscious to have fewer fights, but it came more from a desire to have a different kind of pacing than to answer the 'ludonarrative dissonance' argument. Because we don't buy into it".

In 2016, Frédéric Seraphine, semiotician and researcher specialized in game design at the University of Tokyo wrote a literature review about the notion of ludonarrative dissonance. In this article, developing on debates sparked by Hocking's blog post, Seraphine identifies the reason of ludonarrative dissonance as an opposition between "incentives" and "directives" within the "ludic structure (the gameplay)" and the "narrative structure (the story)".

Chris Plante of Polygon wrote there had been an increasing number of games being designed around violence that meant the story shifted to accommodate gameplay, rather than vice versa. He considered the game The Last of Us Part II, also directed by Druckmann, to be the culmination of this ludonarrative dissonance due to its revenge-driven plot. Plante argued that due to the appeal and constant supply of violent games it was unnecessary for them to justify why their player characters exhibited violence, and expressed his desire for more games to tell stories that didn't hinge around violence.

Debates on the potential positive use of the notion 
Some scholars, game writers and journalists have challenged the supposedly negative nature of ludonarrative dissonance. Nick Ballantyne, managing editor at GameCloud Australia, in an article from 2015, argues: "What if it could be used to a dev's advantage? Video games can force players into uncomfortable situations, and ludonarrative dissonance can help foster that uncomfortableness. Faux glitches have been used as (ludo)narrative tools before in games such as Eternal Darkness: Sanity's Requiem and Metal Gear Solid 2: Sons of Liberty, so why is ludonarrative dissonance avoided so much? If your intent is to unsettle or confuse a player, then ludonarrative dissonance seems perfect, but it heavily relies on the player". While acknowledging the potential of ludonarrative dissonance to create what he calls "emersion", defined in opposition to "immersion" as the "sensation of being pulled out of the play experience", Seraphine agrees with Ballantyne that it is possible to purposefully use ludonarrative dissonance as a storytelling device. Seraphine concludes his article with: "It seems that more games in the near future might use ludonarrative dissonance as a way to tell more compelling stories. In essence, stories are about characters and the most interesting stories are often told with dissonant characters; as it is the surprise, the disturbance, the accident, the sacrosanct disruptive element, that justifies the very act of telling a story".

In a 2013 Game Developers Conference talk, Spec Ops: The Line writer Walt Williams argued that embracing ludonarrative dissonance allows the developer to portray the character as a hypocrite and force the character to rationalize their actions.

Ludonarrative consistency
The Dead Space series is noted for its ludonarrative consistency. Brett Makedonski of Destructoid states that the gameplay aptly conveys the sense of sheer terror and loneliness that the narrative expertly strives to establish.

See also
 Narrative of video games

References

Further reading
 
 
 "The Last of Us 2 epitomizes one of gaming's longest debates" Polygon article on the archetypes of Ludonarrative dissonance.

Video game design
Video game culture
Video game terminology
Narratology